Hard Sell is a British reality television series which began showing in October 2006 on BBC One, produced by BBC Bristol and presented by Mark Franks. In the show two teams have to sell a collection of items for the greatest price possible.

Format
Hard Sell sets two teams of two, against each other to out-sell each other in a race to make as much money as possible. Each team is issued a suitcase which contains a number of items (of similar value) which they must sell various places of the city. Some of the items are also linked to the region in which the edition of the show is being filmed. The winning team is awarded both the money they make and the profits of the other team.

Trivia
 Filming only takes one day.

External links
 
 
 Hard Sell at UK Game Shows

2006 British television series debuts
2007 British television series endings
BBC Television shows
British reality television series